Orthosia limbata is a moth of the family Noctuidae. It is found in Korea, Japan, China, Taiwan and Nepal.

The wingspan is about 38 mm.

Subspecies
Orthosia limbata limbata (Korea, Japan, China)
Orthosia limbata himalaya Hreblay & Ronkay, 1998 (Nepal)
Orthosia limbata atrata Hreblay & Ronkay, 1998

References

Moths described in 1879
Orthosia
Moths of Japan